The National University of Sciences & Technology (NUST) is a multi-campus public research university having its main campus in Islamabad, Pakistan.

The university offers undergraduate and graduate degrees, including doctoral and professional degrees. Founded in 1991, it was initially formed for the need of commissioned officers by combining engineering colleges and schools. Later, it was converted into a public research university with the main campus setup in Islamabad to promote science and technology in Pakistan.

Founded to provide quality technical education for rapid industrialization in Pakistan, NUST adopted an American university model and stressed laboratory instruction in applied science and engineering. It has since played a key role in the development of standardization in education of fields such as engineering, mathematics, and technology in Pakistan and is widely known for its innovation and academic strength, making it one of the most prestigious institutions of higher learning in Pakistan. The university is also home to an under-construction International Association of Science Parks (IASP) certified National Science and Technology Park. It was ranked #74 in Asian Universities by the QS World University Rankings.

History
NUST was established in March 1991. The first college to be affiliated with NUST was MCS in 1991. In 1993, the university was granted a charter and CEME and MCE became part of the university.  In December 1994 and November 1995, CAE and PNEC became constituents of NUST respectively. All the constituent colleges were upgraded and MS programmes were started at CAE in September 1997. In 1998, MS programmes were started at PNEC and in the same year, Bachelor of Dental Surgery was started at AMC. In 1999, CEME and CAE attained ISO 9001 Certification, School of Electrical Engineering and Computer Sciences (SEECS) was launched in Islamabad and NUST Business School (NBS, formerly known as NIMS) was established. School of Mechanical and Manufacturing Engineering (SMME) offers degrees in Mechanical and Biomedical Engineering and is one of the most competitive engineering schools of Pakistan.

Recognized university
As of 2016, NUST has over 15,000 full-time students enrolled, over 20 departments with over 1,280 academic faculty staff. It is ranked by QS World Ranking's as among the leading 50 universities under the age of 50 and is ranked by QS as among top 334 universities in the world. It is the number 1 ranked university in Pakistan according to QS World ranking 2021. It is also ranked by QS as among top 300 in world in Electrical Engineering, and top 500 in Business Studies and Mathematics. While Times Higher Education Ranking's rank's NUST as among the top 100 universities from BRICS and Emerging economies, as among top 120 in Asia and among top 250 globally in the field of Electrical Engineering. In 2016, it was also ranked as among the next 50 leading young universities globally by Time's. NUST is a member of Association of Commonwealth Universities, United Nations Academic Impact and Talloires Network.

NUST is the first model university established by the Ministry of Science and Technology like KAIST of Korea. The student body consists of 7,000+ students, including 102 international students and 884 postgraduate students. In 2015, more than 70,000 candidates applied for the undergraduate program at NUST. NUST has 675 full-time employed faculty staff including 17 members from international universities and many professors and lecturers are a part of visiting faculty of NUST. In addition to this, professors from universities around the world visit NUST under collaborative arrangements.

After the independence of Pakistan in 1947, the training of military corpsmen became one of the top priorities of the new Government. In 1947, Military College of Signals was established as School of Signals. A year later, in 1948, the School of Military Engineering (SME) was established at Sialkot to train the corps in the field of engineering. In 1951, it was given the status of college -Military College of Engineering (MCE)- and was shifted to its present location in Risalpur. On 1 April 1957, EME School was established at Quetta and in 1969, it was given the status of college (CEME) and civilians were admitted. In 1962 PNEC was established in Karachi. To train the members of the Pakistan Air Force, the College of Aeronautical Engineering (CAE) was established at Korangi Creek, Karachi in 1965. In 1976, the College of Medical Sciences was established as the Army Medical College (AMC) and a year later in 1977 the first MBBS course started there. In the same year the School of Signals was upgraded to a college. In 1981 a BSc program started at CEME giving it the status of a university and a few years later in April 1984 CEME moved to its current location in Rawalpindi from Quetta. In May 1986, CAE was shifted to the PAF Academy in Risalpur.

In 2003, CEME received ISO 9001-2000 certification. In the same year, the Center for Cyber Technology and Spectrum Management was launched in Islamabad. In May 2004, the Center for Advanced Mathematics and Physics was created. A Ph.D program started at CEME in 2006. In 2007, the Center of Virology and Immunology was developed to increase research in the field of medical sciences in Pakistan. In 2008, a new campus was developed in Islamabad. Some old colleges are being shifted to this campus and new schools are being developed such as School of Civil and Environmental Engineering, School of Chemical and Materials Engineering, School of Mechanical and Manufacturing Engineering and Research Center for Modeling and Simulation. In 2012, NUST renamed NUST Center of Virology and Immunology as Atta ur Rahman School of Applied Biosciences to honor Prof. Atta ur Rehman. The majority of the faculty members are PhD and M.Phil. professors from universities around the world. A large number of sponsored students and faculty members, doing their PhD abroad, are scheduled to return to NUST from 2008 onwards which will further increase the number of PhD professors in the faculty.

NUST has implemented the Learning Management System (LMS). It offers to its instructors and students an extensive platform to learn and flourish. The best is brought online to make the learning process more efficient and effective. The online learning includes functionalities like courses management, file management, user management, user communication, online grading system, offline/online assignment submission and other things related to academics. LMS provides a convenient access to important information related to the different subjects running through the semester. Faculty can create their own courses in which they can manage their course materials and related documents. An overview of course proceedings can be seen with a quick look and the whole semester activities like quiz, assignments and exams. The system improves continuously with the valuable user's feedback which is the backbone of the learning system. In 2015, Course Management System was introduced and is in the phase of development.

Campuses
NUST is a multi-campus university with the headquarters located in Islamabad. Campuses of NUST are located in the following cities:

Islamabad
Sector H-12 Campus:

The campus in Sector H-12 Islamabad was initiated in 2008. Besides NUST Headquarters, the schools and institutes that were relocated to this campus include School of Civil and Environmental Engineering, School of Mechanical and Manufacturing Engineering, School of Electrical Engineering and Computer Science, School of Chemical and Materials Engineering, Research Center for Modeling and Simulation, School of Natural Sciences (formerly known as Center for Advanced Mathematics and Physics), Atta-ur-Rehman School of Applied Bio-sciences, School of Art Design and Architecture, NUST Business School, School of Social Sciences and Humanities, Professional Development Center, Technology Incubation Center, Marketing and Industrial Relations Organization, NUST Publishing and NUST Outreach and Talent Hunt Initiative. It also has a department for career counselling named Centre for Counselling and Career Advisory (C3A) that helps provide primary mental health facilities.

Sports facilities such as cricket, volleyball courts, basketball, soccer and squash courts are present while hockey stadium and tennis courts are under construction. Hostels for both male and female students are present inside the campus. Facilities in the hostels include badminton courts, basketball and gymnasiums. Some hostel rooms have attached baths while others have community baths. The campus recently inaugurated a central library next to the Headquarters, along with a race course track and a horse riding club. In 2017, a small hiking trail was also opened up for students in order to promote physical well-being. Various cafeterias are constructed in the campus to facilitate the students, along with a tailor shop, a barber shop and various bakeries and shopping marts. Separate housing facility for the university staff is also present in the campus. Moreover, the campus also houses the NUST Science and Technology Park (NSTP). It also has a central gymnasium (along with several others in hostels) and a lake.

Rawalpindi
College of Electrical and Mechanical Engineering (CEME):

Located on Grand Trunk Road in Rawalpindi, EME is the largest constituent college of NUST. The campus includes all on-campus facilities, auditorium and conference hall, accommodation and mess facilities. The library is fully computerized, with a collection of 70,000 volumes.

Sports facilities at EME includes three tennis courts, a basketball court, a squash court, a badminton court, football ground, cricket pitch, a swimming pool and two gymnasiums.

Military College of Signals (MCS):

Located on Hamayun Road in Rawalpindi Cantt, it is the oldest constituent college of NUST, founded in 1947 after the independence of Pakistan to train the members of Pakistan Armed Forces. It has three departments, namely Electrical, Computer Software and Information Security departments. The MCS library is computerized, with over 55,000 volumes. It spreads over 50 acres of area and is located in the heart of Rawalpindi Cantt.

Risalpur

College of Aeronautical Engineering (CAE):

The college comprises four departments; Aerospace Engineering Department, Avionics Department, Industrial Engineering Department and Humanities and Sciences Department.

Aerospace Engineering Department has five major labs; aerodynamics lab, structure lab, propulsion and heat transfer lab, material science lab and numerical analysis lab. Avionics Department has six labs which include guidance lab, navigation and control system lab, antenna lab, communication lab, radar, microwave and digital system lab and embedded system lab.

The campus is equipped with a library, auditorium, conference hall, dining facilities and hostel facilities, although more hostel accommodation is required for a conducive study environment. The college library has a collection of 80,000 technical and reference books. Sports facilities at the campus include table tennis, badminton, basketball, tennis, volleyball, football, hockey, swimming, golf and cricket.

Military College of Engineering (Pakistan) (MCE):

College of Civil Engineering and National Institute of Transportation are located on this campus. MCE is one of the oldest constituent colleges of NUST, founded in 1948. The campus houses laboratories, a computer centre, library with 41,000 books, sports facilities and hostels.

Karachi

Pakistan Navy Engineering College (PNEC)

The college campus is spread over an area of about  comprising the administration block, four academic blocks, postgraduate studies center, labs and workshops, professional development center, an auditorium, a mosque, a dispensary, hostel and dining facilities. The campus is home to the Computer Aided Designing and Manufacturing Center and the Professional Development Center.

The campus has a library. A section known as the "Book Bank" stocks used textbooks, loaning them out to undergraduate students for a whole semester, charging 10% of the original cost of the book.
The campus offers undergraduate courses in Electrical, Mechanical and Naval Architecture Engineering and Maritime Sciences. The students of PNEC are one of the finest engineers in Pakistan and have a high demand both inside and outside the country.

Quetta

NUST Balochistan Campus (NBC)

NBC is located on Chagi Road, Quetta Cantonment and was  Inaugurated by Chief of the Army Staff General Qamar Javed Bajwa in September 2019.
The concept of establishing NBC is to help the Government and people of Balochistan in the development of human resources by producing a quality workforce in the fields of Civil engineering and computer sciences.

The campus is quipped with libraries, well-furnished laboratories, societies, cafeteria grounds and highly qualified faculty. It currently has 100 students and 10 faculty members.

Academics

Degree programs
NUST schools and colleges offered the following degree programs. The regular duration of BS and MS/M Phil degree programs are four and two years, respectively.

Research 
A Research and Development (R&D) Directorate is established at the NUST headquarters which encourages the growth of research in the university. All efforts of R&D Directorate are coordinated through an organizational structure consisting of NUST headquarters, R&D Cells at each constituent college and NUST's commercial arms. The mission of Research Directorate is to facilitate and co-ordinate research activities of NUST constituent institutions and to liaise with other national as well as international academics, research and industrial organizations to facilitate research at NUST. It has collaboration with various International agencies such as, USAID, British Council, UKAID, QNRF, TWAS, BP, NRG Bio-fuel Canada, German Academic Exchange Service (DAAD) and many others.

R&D cells 
Each college, institute and center has an R&D Cell headed by a PhD qualified faculty member who co-ordinates, monitors and records all the R&D activities of the college. The head coordinates all the activities among departments, faculty members, researchers, students and industries identifying potential projects and sources of funds.

NUST Consulting
NUST Consulting helps researchers undertake consultancy services with external agencies. In this regard, all centers are involved with NC to improve efficiency, reduce of wastage, increase productivity and improve quality.

Technology Incubation Center
NUST has established a Technology Incubation Center with an aim to combine industrial development and technological research together and establish the linkages between institutes and the industry. The Incubation Centre has been mentoring and hosting startups since 2005. TIC will also help faculty members in identifying the end users apart from commercializing of R&D output.

University research journals
The university publishes the following journals:
 NUST Journal of Engineering Sciences, 
 NUST Journal of Business and Economics, 
 NUST Journal of Natural Sciences, 
 Pakistan Armed Forces Medical Journal, 
 TECHNOCRAT - Journal of Science and Technology,

University-industry linkages
The new campus established in Islamabad is co-located with Tech Town in Sector I-12 where IT and electronics related industries and technology parks are planned to be set up, so as to promote university and industry linkages. Apart from this, NUST is providing training and consultancy services to the industry and other business organizations.

NUST has also bought lab equipment needed for doctoral and postdoctoral research work, with financing through Islamic Development Bank (IDB). IDB has provided 26 Million US$ as grant for buying the services of researchers from abroad, over and above the programs of Ministry of Science and Technology, Pakistan.

Rankings and awards

NUST was the first university in Pakistan to achieve ISO 9000 certification. The constituent colleges that have been certified for ISO Quality Management System include College of Aeronautical Engineering, Military College of Engineering (Pakistan), College of Electrical and Mechanical Engineering, Pakistan Navy Engineering College and Military College of Signals. NUST won two gold and a silver medal out of three gold and three silver medals awarded by the Pakistan Engineering Council for 2005, 2006 and, 2007 for Best Graduate of the Year Award. NUST faculty members won seven awards, including President's Gold Medal, Best Researcher, Distinguished Scientist and Best University Teacher awards during 2007.

According to a survey, NUST is the most popular choice for engineering students in Pakistan. 
Google Trends show that NUST is the most searched Pakistani university ever since 2004 outranking some of the famous international universities as Sabancı University of Turkey.

In 2013, SCImago ranked NUST as 1568 in the world, 480 in the region and 6th in the country for the reporting period of 2007–11. In 2014, Webometric world university rankings ranked it at 150 in the world, 3rd in the country and 22nd in South Asia.

Higher Education Commission of Pakistan ranked NUST as the number one university in the category of 'General University: Large' in 2013 and in the category 'Engineering and Technology' in 2014 and 2015.

According to the QS World University Rankings for 2022 - 2023, ranked NUST as 334th in the world and in the Engineering category, the university was ranked as 251–300. NUST ranks #74 in Asian University Rankings in 2022.

Foreign collaborations

International universities

NUST has developed collaborations with international universities to ensure two-way flow of knowledge. These include Stanford University, Iowa State University, University of Michigan, University of Central Florida, University of North Carolina at Charlotte, California Institute of Technology (Caltech), Cranfield University, University of Manchester, University of the West of England, University of Southampton, University of Surrey, Charles Darwin University, University of Melbourne, University of New South Wales, University of Queensland, Beijing University of Aeronautics and Astronautics, Nanjing University, Beijing Institute of Technology, Tokyo Institute of Technology ,  Technical University of Munich and Technical University of Denmark (DTU).

NUST has collaborations with universities in the field of medical sciences, such as Harvard University Medical School, New York Medical College, Virginia Cancer Institute, King's College London (University of London), Queen Mary, University of London, Imperial College London, University of New South Wales, University of Sydney, University of Queensland, Edith Cowan University and University of Dublin (Trinity College, St. James Hospital, School of Pharmacy), Ireland.

Quality networks and associations

NUST is a member of the International Network for Quality Assurance Agencies in Higher Education (INQAAHE) and Asia-Pacific Quality Network (APQN). NUST has also been granted the membership of Association of Commonwealth Universities and International Association of Universities.

Other entities

NUST has the following international collaborations:
Collaboration with CERN since December 2001. NUST has been awarded Associate Membership of CERN.
Collaboration with Caltech on a project titled 'Interactive Grid Analysis Environment'. Research funding of US$0.18 million has been approved under Pak-US collaboration for this project.
Collaboration with Stanford University since February 2004 in a project titled 'Measurement and Analysis for the Global Grid and Internet End-to-End Performance (MAGGIE)'. Research funding of US$0.162 Million has been approved under Pak-US collaboration for this project.
NUST School of Electrical Engineering and Computer Science (formerly NUST Institute of Information Technology) has been declared Microsoft Authorized Academic Training Program Institute (AATPI) by Microsoft Corporation, USA.
Intel Corporation has established a computer lab at SEECS.
NCR Corporation has established their Data warehouse and Data mining lab at SEECS.
IBM has registered NUST on worldwide offering for higher education to selected universities.
Artificial Intelligence R&D Lab has been set up in NUST School of Electrical Engineering and Computer Science (SEECS) in collaboration with German Research Centre for Artificial Intelligence (German DFKI) and University of Kaiserslautern (TUKL), Germany.

Student life
The institute offers opportunities for students to participate in technical and professional societies. Study trips to industries and organizations are arranged, guest speakers from institutes and industry are invited and seminars and workshops are held. Sports facilities are available in all campuses.
 
Student Bodies

Student run organizations, societies and clubs are present in almost all the NUST campuses. These include Computer Society of Pakistan - NUST Chapter, NUST Community services club, a community service student-run body TABA - NUST Chapter, NUST Skill Development Club, NUST Volunteer Club, NUST Science Society, NUST Deep Learning Society, NUST Adventure Club, Literary Circle, Book Club, Fine Arts Club, Innovation and Entrepreneurship Society, Media (Photography) Club, Pakistan, Innovation Society, Debating Society, Aeromodelling Club, NUST Environment Club, Telecom Society, Software Society, IT Club, Automobile Club and Sports Club. Deep Sea Diving and Sailing Club is available for the students of the Pakistan Navy Engineering College in Karachi.

Sports facilities

All the campuses have their own sports facilities. Courts for indoor games and activities such as table tennis, badminton and squash are available in almost all campuses. Tennis, basketball and volleyball courts, hockey, football and cricket grounds are also present in all the main campuses. Some colleges have swimming pools and gymnasiums.

Student residence

Separate hostels for boys and girls are available in most colleges and is at various stages of completion in the rest. Students of College of Aeronautical Engineering (CAE) are provided separate accommodations, while students at Military College of Signals (MCS), College of Electrical and Mechanical Engineering (CEME) and Army Medical College (AMC) are placed in the newly constructed dormitories at the campus. Pakistan Navy Engineering College has sufficient hostel facilities for both male and female students. The H-12 campus of NUST also has separate hostels for boys and girls. These include Attar, Ghazali, Razi, Rumi, Zakria and Hajweri hostels for boys and Fatima, Zainab, Khadija and Ayesha hostels for girls. Dining and mess facilities are located in all campuses.

References

External links
NUST official website
NUST LMS
NUST CMS

 
Pakistan Army universities and colleges
Educational institutions established in 1991
1991 establishments in Pakistan
Public universities and colleges in Pakistan